Valeria Esposito (born 1961 in Naples) is an Italian operatic soprano. She won the Singer of the World prize in the 1987 BBC Cardiff Singer of the World competition.

References

External links
 

1961 births
Living people
Musicians from Naples
Italian operatic sopranos